Pingarssuit Mountain (P-Mountain, colloq.) is a Greenland landform near Thule Air Base and which has a USAF military installation.

History
During the Cold War, Thule Site N-32 on P-Mountain had a US Army Air Defense Command Post for Project Nike to control the 4 missile sites in the area (the USAF also had a radar at the site for control of aircraft traffic in the area.)  A late 1960s satellite communications terminal was moved from the Thule P-Mountain site to Thule Site J in 1983.

References

Mountains of Greenland